Isaac Van Duzen Reeve (29 July 1813 Butternuts, Otsego County, New York – 31 December 1890 New York City) was a soldier in the United States Army during the 19th century. He rose to the rank of colonel, and retired a few years after his service in the American Civil War.

Biography
Reeve graduated from the United States Military Academy in 1835, was engaged in the Seminole Wars in 1836–1837 and in 1840–1842, and served throughout the Mexican–American War. He became captain in 1846, and received the brevet of major and lieutenant colonel for gallant and meritorious service at Contreras, Churubusco, and Molino del Rey. He commanded the expedition against the Pinal Apaches 1858–1859, became major in May 1861, was made prisoner of war by Gen. David E. Twiggs on 9 May of that year, and was not exchanged until 20 August 1862. He was chief mustering and disbursing officer in New York City, 1862–1863, became lieutenant colonel in September 1862, and was in command of the draft rendezvous at Pittsburgh, Pennsylvania, 1864–1865. He became colonel of the 13th infantry in October 1864, and was brevetted brigadier general in the U.S. Army, 13 March 1865, "for faithful and meritorious service during the civil war." In January 1871, he was retired at his own request.

Notes

References
 

1813 births
1890 deaths
People from Butternuts, New York
United States Military Academy alumni
United States Army officers
Union Army colonels